Corroboree frogs comprise two species of frog native to the Southern Tablelands of Australia. Both species are small, poisonous ground-dwelling frogs. The two species are the southern corroboree frog (Pseudophryne corroboree) and the northern corroboree frog (Pseudophryne pengilleyi). They are unique among frogs in that they produce their own poison rather than obtain it from their food source as is the case in every other poisonous frog species.

Description
The northern form of the corroboree frog deviates slightly in having narrow yellow to greenish stripes and is slightly smaller.

Distribution
The corroboree frogs have historically only been found in a few patches across two regions of the Australian Capital Territory (ACT) and southern New South Wales (NSW), and these areas have contracted significantly in recent years.

These populations live in the following areas: spanning the Fiery Range and Bogong Peaks in Kosciuszko National Park,  the Bondo, Micalong and Wee Jasper State Forests in NSW; along the Brindabella Ranges in Namadgi National Park in the ACT; and Bimberi Nature Reserve and Brindabella National Park in NSW.

Biology

Reproduction

Southern corroboree frog (Pseudophryne corroboree)
Critically Endangered (CR)
Sexual maturity of P. corroboree is reached at four years of age, with one year as an embryo/tadpole and two years as a juvenile/subadult. Adults primarily have only one breeding season. Breeding occurs around December terrestrially near shallow pools, fens, seepages, wet grassland or wet heaths, where the males build chamber nests within the grasses and moss. Males compete for females via song. Each male will attract up to ten females to his burrow sequentially and may dig a new burrow if his first is filled with eggs.  The female lays up to 38 eggs and the male grasps her and deposits sperm directly onto the eggs.  Tadpoles develop but remain within the protective egg coat until hatching occurs when high ground-water levels after rain cause the nest to become flooded at 4 to 6 months. Tadpole development takes six to eight months. Metamorphosis occurs between December and February.

Northern corroboree frog (Pseudophryne pengilleyi)
Endangered (EN)
P. pengilleyi prefers to breed in sphagnum bogs and wet heath in sub-alpine areas and dense patches of herbs in openings or seepages amongst fallen tussocks at lower elevation (bog pools at high altitudes above  and in shallow seepage pools in gullies at lower altitudes of ). Other reproductive details are as for P. corroboree. Both species are restricted to mountain and sub-alpine woodlands, heathlands and grasslands.

Non-breeding habitat for both species occurs in forest, woodland and heath adjacent to breeding sites.

Diet
The typical diet of a mature southern corroboree frog includes beetles, mites, ants and insect larvae. However, as tadpoles they also tend to eat algae and other small pieces of organic material found in their pools.

Toxicity
Corroboree frogs are the first vertebrates discovered that are able to produce their own poisonous alkaloid, as opposed to obtaining it via diet as many other frogs do. The alkaloid is secreted from the skin as a defence against predation, and potentially against skin infections by microbes. It has been described as potentially lethal to mammals if ingested. The unique alkaloid produced has been named pseudo-phrynamine.

Behaviour
Corroboree frogs are quite unusual in their nature. Not only do they not start breeding until four years of age, they also hibernate during winter under whatever shelter they can find. This may be snow gum trees, or bits of bark or fallen leaves. Males stay with the egg nests and may breed with many females over the course of one season.

Conservation status

The southern corroboree frog was considered relatively numerous within its very small distribution in the 1970s, as of June 2004 it had an estimated adult population of 64, but suffered declines of up to 80% over the 10 years up to 1989, at which time it was found only within a fragmented region of less than  within Kosciuszko National Park. It has been listed as critically endangered since at least 2004 and is considered to be one of Australia's most endangered species. There are fewer than 30 individuals left in the wild .

The northern corroboree frog has not suffered as badly as the southern. In 2004 it was downgraded from an IUCN assessment of critical to endangered.

Cause for decline
The main threats to the survival of the frogs are thought to be infection with the chytrid fungus and bushfires.

Severe bushfires in the Victorian and NSW high country in January 2003 destroyed much of the frogs' remaining habitat, especially the breeding sites and the leaf litter that insulates overwintering adults. The fire affected almost all southern corroboree frog habitat, although later surveys showed that the fire resulted in a lower than expected decline in population.}

The 2019–2020 bushfires in Australia destroyed a significant portion of Kosciusko National Park, and killed two-thirds of the southern corroboree frogs contained in specially designed disease-free enclosures built by conservationists.

Other threats to the southern species include residential and commercial development (including ski resorts); climate change (causing drought and fires); and pollution.

Other causes such as habitat destruction from recreational 4WD use; feral animals; degradation of the frogs' habitat; and increased UV radiation flowing from ozone layer depletion. The drought affects these frogs by drying out their breeding sites so that the breeding cycle, which is triggered by seasonal changes and may require moistening of the bogs in autumn and spring to bring on specific developmental events, is delayed. This may mean that tadpoles have not metamorphosed by late summer when their bogs dry out, and so perish.

Conservation efforts
The Amphibian Research Centre had already begun a rescue programme under which eggs were collected and raised to late tadpole stage before return as close as possible to their collection site.  Research is now under way into captive breeding and on which life cycle stage – eggs, tadpoles or adults – promises the best chance of survival following return to the wild.  The national parks authorities in the ACT, NSW and Victoria have developed conservation programmes, including a captive husbandry programme at Tidbinbilla, ACT; Taronga Zoo in Sydney; and at Healesville Sanctuary, by Zoos Victoria.

Conservationists have stepped up efforts to increase the population of the southern corroboree frog since the 2019–20 bushfires. In March 2022, 100 frogs were released into the park as part of a joint breeding program between Taronga Zoo, Zoos Victoria, the NSW National Parks and Wildlife Service and the NSW Government's "Saving our Species" program. At this time there are five enclosures for the frogs, with the newest one built to better withstand the effect of fire.

References

External links

Southern Corroboree Frog (Frogs of Australia)
Southern corroboree frog (Zoos Victoria)
Northern corroboree frog (Tidbinbilla Nature Reserve)
Project Corroboree homepage (Amphibian Research Centre)
Corroboree frog (Includes a good picture of frogs' underbellies)
Recovery Plan for the Southern Corroboree Frog NSW National Parks & Wildlife Service, July 2001 
Southern Corroboree Frog (Threatened Species Profile) NSW National Parks & Wildlife Service, 1999

Pseudophryne
Amphibians of New South Wales
Amphibians of Victoria (Australia)
Amphibians described in 1953
Frogs of Australia
Amphibian common names